The WAFU Zone B U-20 Championship is an association football tournament that is contested between competition contested by national teams of Zone B of the West African Football Union.The current champions are Ghana.

Eligible participants

Inaugural Tournament (2018)
Eight teams were drawn in two groups of four. WAFU Zone B member teams were Ivory Coast, Niger, Burkina Faso, Ghana, Nigeria and Benin. Mali (from Zone A) replaced Côte d'Ivoire, who had withdrawn before the tournament, and Senegal (from Zone A) were invited to make the numbers up to eight. The tournament was won by Senegal after defeating Nigeria in the final.

Previous Tournaments

See also 

 WAFU Zone A U-20 Tournament
 WAFU U-20 Championship

References

External links 
 WafuOnline.com - Official Site

International association football competitions in Africa
 
West African Football Union competitions